The Natural Environment and Rural Communities Act 2006 (c 16), also referred to as the NERC Act (2006), is an Act of the Parliament of the United Kingdom. In a reorganisation of public bodies involved in rural policy and delivery, the measures dissolved English Nature, the Countryside Agency and the Rural Development Service, and established Natural England.

Chapter 1
Chapter 1 (sections 1–16) deals with the establishment and role of Natural England. English Nature and the Countryside Agency are dissolved, and most of their powers transferred to the new agency.

Chapter 2 
Chapter 2 (sections 17–25) establishes as a public body the Commission for Rural Communities, which had been created in 2005 as a division of the Countryside Agency. Subsequently, a statement in June 2010 by Caroline Spelman led to the abolition of the commission.

Section 39 – Joint Nature Conservation Committee 
Section 39 and Schedule 4 reconstitute the Joint Nature Conservation Committee.

Sections 40 to 42 – Duty to conserve biodiversity 
Section 40 of the NERC Act places a duty to conserve biodiversity on public authorities in England. It requires local authorities and government departments to have regard to the purposes of conserving biodiversity in a manner that is consistent with the exercise of their normal functions such as policy and decision-making. 'Conserving biodiversity' may  include enhancing, restoring or protecting a population or a habitat.

Section 41 requires the Secretary of State to publish and maintain lists of species and types of habitats which are regarded by Natural England to be of "principal importance" for the purposes of conserving biodiversity in England. These 56 priority habitats and 943 species are drawn from earlier lists of United Kingdom Biodiversity Action Plan Priority Species and Habitats. The Section 41 lists are needed by decision-makers in local and regional authorities when carrying out their duties under Section 40 of the Act.

Section 42 similarly required the National Assembly for Wales to publish equivalent lists of priority species and habitats for that country. However, this requirement (and one specified in Section 40 for Wales) has been superseded by virtue of similar requirements being enshrined in the Environment (Wales) Act 2016.

Sections 87 to 97 – reform of various agricultural bodies 
The act laid the ground for rationalisation of levy-funded boards in agriculture and related industries, leading to the establishment in 2008 of the Agriculture and Horticulture Development Board.

Section 107 – Commencement
The following orders have been made under this section:
The Natural Environment and Rural Communities Act 2006 (Commencement No. 1) Order 2006 (S.I. 2006/1176 (C.40))
The Natural Environment and Rural Communities Act 2006 (Commencement No. 2) Order 2006 (S.I. 2006/1382 (C.47))
The Natural Environment and Rural Communities Act 2006 (Commencement No. 3 and Transitional Provisions) Order 2006 (S.I. 2006/2541 (C.86))
The Natural Environment and Rural Communities Act 2006 (Commencement No. 4) Order 2007 (S.I. 2007/816 (C.32))
The Natural Environment and Rural Communities Act 2006 (Commencement No. 1) (England) Order 2007 (S.I. 2007/2540 (C.97))
The Natural Environment and Rural Communities Act 2006 (Commencement) (Wales) Order 2006 (S.I. 2006/2992 (W.279) (C.106)

See also
List of United Kingdom Biodiversity Action Plan species
Environment (Wales) Act 2016
Wildlife and Natural Environment (Scotland) Act 2011

References
Halsbury's Statutes

External links
Biodiversity duty: public authority duty to have regard to conserving biodiversity, Natural England and DEFRA, first published October 2014
The Natural Environment and Rural Communities Act 2006, as amended from the National Archives
The Natural Environment and Rural Communities Act 2006, as originally enacted from the National Archives
Explanatory notes to the Natural Environment and Rural Communities Act 2006

United Kingdom Acts of Parliament 2006
Environmental law in the United Kingdom
Rural society in the United Kingdom
Conservation in the United Kingdom
Conservation in England